The 2022 Energy X-Prix (formally the 2022 Uruguay Natural Energy X-Prix) was an Extreme E off-road race that was held on 26 and 27 November 2022 in the seaside city of Punta del Este, in the Maldonado Department of Uruguay. It was the fifth and final round of the electric off-road racing car series' second season, and also marked the first running of the event.

Abt Cupra XE won its first X-Prix with Nasser Al-Attiyah and Klara Andersson. They were followed by Neom McLaren Extreme E, who visited the podium for the first time, and X44 Vida Carbon Racing's Sébastien Loeb and Cristina Gutiérrez. This third place, combined with the 5 extra Super Sector points, granted Lewis Hamilton's team both the drivers' and the teams' titles ahead of reigning champions Rosberg X Racing.

Classification

Qualifying

Notes:
 Tie-breakers were determined by Super Sector times.

Semi-final 1

Notes:
  – GMC Hummer EV Chip Ganassi Racing originally finished second, but received a pair of 10-second time penalties for taking down two waypoint flags.

Semi-final 2

Crazy Race

Notes:
  – Rosberg X Racing had completed enough of the distance to be classified third, but was later disqualified for having too many mechanics present inside its switch bay area during the driver switch. The team still got the point for overall tenth place from the event.

Final

Notes:
  – Team awarded 5 additional points for being fastest in the Super Sector.
  – Genesys Andretti United Extreme E finished third on the road, but received a 7-second time penalty for speeding in the switch zone. X44 Vida Carbon Racing, who originally finished fourth, inherited the position. X44 later received a 5-second time penalty themselves for causing a collision, but it was not enough to relegate them back to fourth and they kept third place, which granted them the title.

References

External links
 

|- style="text-align:center"
|width="35%"|Previous race:2022 Copper X-Prix
|width="30%"|Extreme E Championship2022 season
|width="35%"|Next race:2023 Desert X-Prix
|- style="text-align:center"
|width="35%"|Previous race:N/A
|width="30%"|Energy X-Prix
|width="35%"|Next race:N/A
|- style="text-align:center"

Energy X-Prix
Energy X-Prix
Energy X-Prix
Auto races in Uruguay
Sport in Maldonado Department